George Duffield (born 1946) is an English jockey.

George Duffield may also refer to:

 George C. Duffield, trail boss whose 1866 diary shaped the character Gil Favor (Eric Fleming) on the television series Rawhide
 George Duffield (Reverend) (1732–1790), Presbyterian minister, aka George Duffield II
 George Duffield (Presbyterian) (1794–1868), Presbyterian minister, aka George Duffield IV
 George Duffield Jr. (1812–1888), American hymn writer, aka George Duffield V
 George Duffield (film-maker), British film producer and wildlife photographer